The Zollinger Lamella roof, named after Friedrich Zollinger, a municipal building surveyor from Merseburg in the German state of Saxony-Anhalt is a construction type where the roof is constructed in an arched network consisting of a single lamellae arranged in rhombic form.

The vault system comprises short structural members interwoven across a curved surface in a diamond pattern. Lamella structures can be constructed of wood timber or lumber, concrete, or metal. Modern versions of this type of structure include glazed metal-framed systems referred to as "transparent shells."

See also
 Geodesic dome

References

Architecture
Timber framing
Structural system